The following are international rankings of Croatia.

General
 United Nations: Human Development Index 2010, ranked Croatia as 51st out of 169 countries.  In all, 194 countries were listed, but 25 were not ranked.  Croatia is in the top third of nations labeled as having "high human development", which starts with the 43rd country.  The top 42 nations in the index are labeled as having "very high human development".  Human Development is quantified using such factors as longevity, education, and income.  Human Development Index and its components

Economic
 The Wall Street Journal and the Heritage Foundation: Index of Economic Freedom publish an annual Index of Economic Freedom.  In 2011, they listed Croatia as having the 82nd freest economy among 179 countries in the world.

Political
 Transparency International publishes an annual Corruption Perceptions Index.  In 2010 , Croatia ranked 62nd out of 178 countries.  The CPI measures the degree to which public sector corruption is perceived to exist in 178 countries around the world.  The 2010 results are drawn from 13 surveys and assessments published between January 2009 and September 2010.CPI 2010
Reporters Without Borders  publishes a Press Freedom Index.  In 2010 , Croatia tied for 62nd out of 178 countries, up from 78th in 2009.
The 2014 Global Peace Index ranked Croatia 26th out of 162 countries.

Other

References

Croatia